Longtan Subdistrict is a subdistrict and the county seat of Guiyang County in Hunan, China. The town was formed through the amalgamation of 4 communities of the former Chengguan Town, 3 villages of the former Chengjiao Township, Wutong Village of Renyi Town, Shanbei Village of Zhangshi Town and 3 state-owned farms in 2012.

See also 
 List of township-level divisions of Hunan

References

Divisions of Guiyang County
County seats in Hunan
Subdistricts of Hunan